Saleem Amer Obaid (born January 17, 1992) is a Jordanian footballer who plays as a left back for Al-Wehdat.

International
He made his debut for the Jordan national football team on 23 March 2019 in a 2019 International Friendship Championship game against Syria, as a starter.

References

External links 
 
 
 

Association football midfielders
Al-Ahli SC (Amman) players
Jordanian footballers
1992 births
Living people
Jordan international footballers